Nastasia Noens (born 12 September 1988) is a French World Cup alpine ski racer. She competes in the technical events and specializes in slalom. She made her World Cup debut in November 2006 and her first podium in January 2011.

From Nice, Alpes-Maritimes, Noens represented France at three Winter Olympics and was seventh in the slalom in 2014. She has competed at seven World Championships, and was ninth in slalom in 2011 and 2015.

World Cup results

Season standings

Race podiums
 3 podiums – (3 SL); 30 top tens

World Championship results

Olympic results

Video/photo
YouTube.com – video – Nastasia Noens – Flachau – 1st run – 2011-01-11
YouTube.com – video – Nastasia Noens
Zimbio.com – photos – Nastasia Noens

References

External links

French Ski Team – 2023 women's A team – 

1988 births
Living people
French female alpine skiers
Alpine skiers at the 2010 Winter Olympics
Alpine skiers at the 2014 Winter Olympics
Alpine skiers at the 2018 Winter Olympics
Alpine skiers at the 2022 Winter Olympics
Olympic alpine skiers of France
Sportspeople from Nice